Majed Asad Stadium is an association football stadium in Al-Bireh. The stadium's construction was funded with aid from the French and German governments, and famous French footballer Lilian Thuram participated in the inauguration, taking the first kick of the Palestine Cup final.

Al Nakba International Football Tournament
The stadium was the venue for matches in the 2012 Palestine International Cup. Vietnam and Pakistan played out a goalless draw at the stadium.

References

National stadiums
Sport in the West Bank
Football venues in the State of Palestine